The Khelma, also known as the Sakachep are one of the Old Kuki tribes of northeastern parts of India.

Culture 
Their life style and habits closely resemble the other tribes of the Chin-Kuki-Mizo people. Among the inhabitants of the Dima Hasao district, the Sakachep are one of the smallest communities. The Sakachep are similar in language, customs and traditions to the Biate and Hrangkhol. They used to cremate their dead like the neighboring plains native people in the past.

References

External links
Assam people

Tribes of Assam
Social groups of Assam
Kuki tribes
Scheduled Tribes of Assam